Cafe Society is a 1995 American mystery film directed and written by Raymond De Felitta and starring Frank Whaley, Peter Gallagher, Lara Flynn Boyle, and John Spencer. This movie is based on a true story covered in the national press.

Plot
In 1952, New York society playboy Mickey Jelke inherits a large sum of money.  He spends his nights out in Manhattan, indulging Broadway bars and in the company of prostitutes and pimps.  Unwittingly, Mickey is accused of running a prostitution ring by an unscrupulous undercover cop, aided by Mickey's girlfriend Patricia.  He soon becomes embroiled in shadowy web of political exploitation and scandal.

Cast
 Frank Whaley as Mickey Jelke
 Peter Gallagher as Jack Kale
 Lara Flynn Boyle as Pat Ward
 John Spencer as Ray Davioni
 Anna Levine as Erica Steele
 Christopher Murney as Frank Frustinsky
 Paul Guilfoyle as Anthony Liebler
 Richard B. Shull as Samuel Segal
 David Patrick Kelly as J. Roland Sala
 Cynthia Watros as Dianne Harris

References

External links
 

1995 films
1990s mystery films
American mystery films
Films set in 1952
Films about the upper class
Films set in Manhattan
1990s English-language films
Films directed by Raymond De Felitta
1990s American films